Basudeb Dasgupta (31 December 1938 – 31 August 2005) is an Indian novelist and short-story writer associated with the Hungry generation movement in Bengali literature. He is considered one of the most significant avant-garde and controversial figures in the history of Bengali literature.

Early life and education
His family came to India as refugees following the partition of Bengal in 1947. He graduated with an honours in Bengali literature from the Scottish Church College in 1961, which he followed with a degree in education. Between 1965 and till his retirement in 1999, he taught in a school.

Writings
Basudeb's major contribution to Bengali literature spanned from the early 1960s to the mid-1980s. His distinct styled short stories of that span include Randhanshala (1963), Ratanpur (1964), Basantoutsav (1964), Riputarito (1965), Bamanrahasya (1965), Abhiramer Chalaphera (1967), Leni Bruce O Gopal Bhandke (1968), Debotader Koyekminit (1971), Dr. Wanger Gopan Sanket (1972), Baba (1975) and Durbin (1983).

His only collection of short stories, Randhanshala, was first published in 1965. It is considered a Hungry-classic and reprinted in 1983.

Basudeb Dasgupta published his first novel titled Utpat in 1962 in Upadruto journal and the second one Kheladhula (probably the most significant one) in 1981 in Dandashuk journal.

Thereafter Basudeb wrote a few short stories such as Bondi Bastabata (1986), Mrityuguha Thekey (in two installments in 1986 and 1987), Shesh Praharer Abhijan (1987), Eso (1990) and Mouno Nagarir Itikatha (in two installments in 1995 and 1996), but he had lost the previous magical charm of his prose style and imaginative fictional world.

Books
 Randhanshala (Short story, 1965)
 Break Your Silence Please (Conversations, letters, diary entries, stray proses, 2006, Monfakira)
 Kheladhula (Novel, 2007, Monfakira)
 Lenny Bruce O Gopal Vand Ke (Short story, 2009, Open Secret)

See also

 Shakti Chattopadhyay
 Binoy Majumdar
 Sandipan Chattopadhyay
 Samir Roychoudhury
 Subimal Basak
 Malay Roy Choudhury
 Tridib Mitra
 Falguni Roy
 Hungryalism
 Anil Karanjai

References

External links
 Essays by Educationists on the Movement
 "The Hungry Generation". Time. November 20, 1964.
 Photographs of participants including Basudeb Dasgupta

1938 births
2005 deaths
Bengali-language literature
Bengali novelists
Bengali-language writers
20th-century Indian short story writers
Indian male novelists
Hungry generation
Scottish Church College alumni
University of Calcutta alumni
20th-century novelists
Indian male short story writers
20th-century Indian male writers
Poets from West Bengal